The Seaplane Experimental Station, formerly RNAS Felixstowe, was a British aircraft design unit during the early part of the 20th century.

Creation
During June 1912, surveys began for a suitable site for a base for Naval hydro-aeroplanes, with at first Shotley or Mistley on the River Stour. Ultimately Felixstowe was chosen and the formation of the new Naval Air Station, along with another at Great Yarmouth was announced in April 1913, to be developed along the lines of the station already established on the Isle of Grain.

The unit at Felixstowe was commissioned 5 August 1913 on the River Orwell at Landguard under the command of Captain C. E. Risk, RM as Seaplanes, Felixstowe followed by Lieutenant C. E. H. Rathborne, RN in 1914 and Lieutenant-Commander John Cyril Porte, RN 1915.

RNAS Felixstowe was created soon after the outbreak of World War I following the formation of the Royal Naval Air Service 1 July 1914, from the Naval Wing of the Royal Flying Corps (RFC). Three large hangars 300 feet long and 200 feet wide, with slipways were built by Norwich engineers Boulton & Paul and camouflage paint schemes applied; the base would become the largest operational seaplane station in the United Kingdom.

Operation

As the name implies, the unit designed seaplanes and flying boats. These were generally known by the Felixstowe name although, apart from the prototypes, these flying boats were built by aircraft manufacturers such as Short Brothers, Dick, Kerr & Co. and Phoenix Dynamo Manufacturing Company (the latter two forming part of English Electric in 1918–1919).

Upon Porte's recommendation, the station was initially equipped with Curtiss flying boats. He improved their hull designs, before developing the Felixstowe flying boats from those experiments. Many Felixstowe boats were built under licence in the USA. The craft were flown on long-range patrols to spot the German High Seas Fleet and Zeppelins, with many based at RNAS Felixstowe.

A seaplane carrier, HMS Vindex based at Felixstowe, planned to operate against the Zeppelins; the aircraft, two Bristol Scouts, took off from a short improvised runway on the forward deck. The station also serviced aircraft of the carriers Engadine and Campania.

On 24 April 1916 trials were run in conjunction with the Submarine Service at Parkeston Quay to test the carriage and launching of 2 Sopwith Schneider seaplanes carried on the deck of submarine E22. E22 was sunk the following day off Great Yarmouth by German U-boat SM UB-18.

To begin with the flying boats had little success against U-Boats until the introduction of the "Spider web" system of patrolling. The patrols capitalised on the practice of U-Boats signalling by wireless their homing position, which could be picked up by wireless stations at Hunstanton, Lowestoft and Birchington. The "Spider Web" used the North Hinder Light Vessel, a Dutch maintained light ship 55 miles from Felixstowe and the Hook of Holland as a centre point.  An octagonal figure was drawn with eight arms radiating out from a distance of 30 miles from the centre. A set of circumvential lines then joined the radial arms at 10, 20 and 30 miles making eight sectors, each sector divided into three sections.  As the patrolling flying boat flew up and down each sector line, the area was surveyed twice on any patrol and two sectors of the web could be patrolled in under five hours. A flying boat would take off from Felixstowe and head for the North Hinder Light Vessel then fly along a sector line, determined by previous instructions gained from wireless plots, and then along the patrol lines of the sector. "Web" patrols commenced 13 April 1917.

To increase the range of the aircraft, experiments were carried out in the launch and retrieval of flying boats and bi-planes from specially designed lighters towed behind destroyers of the Harwich Force.

On the formation of the Royal Air Force 1 April 1918, the unit was renamed the Seaplane Experimental Station, Felixstowe and disbanded in June 1919.

Successor
The base and its facilities were later used by the Marine Aircraft Experimental Establishment from 1 April 1924 until the Second World War. It was also used as a base by the Schneider Trophy team, the High Speed Flight. RAF Felixstowe closed 21 June 1962.

Designs
Felixstowe Porte Baby 
Felixstowe F.1
Felixstowe F.2
Felixstowe F.3
Felixstowe F.5
Felixstowe F5L
Felixstowe Fury

Station commanders
Captain C. E. Risk, RM 1913–1914
Lieutenant C. E. H. Rathborne, RN 1914–1915
Commander J. C. Porte, RN 1915–1918
Wing Commander C. E. Risk, RAF 1918–1919
Wing Commander I. T. Courtney, RAF 1919–1922
Flying Officer F. Wilton, RAF 1922–1924
Wing Commander C. E. H. Rathborne, RAF 1924–1925
Wing Commander R. B. Maycock, RAF 1925–1928
Group Captain G. R. Bromet, RAF 1928–1931
Group Captain A. J. Milley, RAF 1931–1936
Group Captain E. J. P. Burling, RAF 1936–1939
Wing Commander D. G. Fleming, RAF 1939–1940
Wing Commander W. B. Hellard, RAF 1940–1942
Wing Commander N. Keeble, RAF 1942–1943
Wing Commander L. G. Martin, RAF 1943–1945
Group Captain W. G. Abrams, RAF 1945–1946
Group Captain W. P. Welch, RAF 1946–1948
Group Captain C. A. Watt, RAF 1948–1949
Wing Commander D. H. Thomas, RAF 1949–1951
Wing Commander C. V. Winn, RAF 1951–1953
Wing Commander J. A. Chorlton, RAF 1953–1954
Wing Commander W. O. Jones, RAF 1954–1956
Wing Commander R. P. Burton, RAF 1956–1957
Wing Commander J. T. O'Sullivan, RAF 1957–1960
Wing Commander C. F. Price, RAF 1960–1961
Wing Commander C. H. Baker, RAF 1961–1962

See also
No. 4 Group RAF
Aeroplane & Armament Experimental Establishment at Martlesham Heath
RAF Coastal Area

References

External links
 
Sons of Our Empire: Film of the Royal Naval Air Service at Felixstowe, about August 1916.
 Seaplanes: Film including the launch of Felixstowe flying boats at the Seaplane Experimental Station, 12 November 1918.
 Felixstowe, Suffolk: Pioneering Sea Plane Base Audio recording.

1915 establishments in England
1919 disestablishments in England
Defunct aircraft manufacturers of the United Kingdom
Royal Naval Air Stations in England
Military research establishments of the United Kingdom
Military history of Suffolk
Seaplane bases in England
Airports in the East of England
Felixstowe